This is a list of flag bearers who have represented Panama at the Olympics.

Flag bearers carry the national flag of their country at the opening ceremony of the Olympic Games.

See also
Panama at the Olympics

References

Panama at the Olympics
Panama
Olympic flagbearers